Ain al-Ajouz, formerly known as Besawme, is a village in northern Syria located west of Homs in the Homs Governorate. According to the Syria Central Bureau of Statistics, Ain al-Ajouz had a population of 436 in the 2004 census. Its inhabitants are predominantly Christians. The village has a Greek Orthodox Church.

References

Bibliography

 

Populated places in Talkalakh District
Christian communities in Syria